North Atlanta may refer to a number of places in the Atlanta, Georgia area:
 North Atlanta, the name of an area now forming part of Brookhaven, Georgia, from 1924 until 1965
 North Atlanta, a name used to refer to Midtown Atlanta in the late 19th century
 The northern part of the City of Atlanta or of the Atlanta metropolitan area
 North Atlanta High School, a public high school in Atlanta

See also
 Neighborhoods in Atlanta